Yun (윤) is a common family name in Korea, which means "governor". The name is sometimes also transliterated as Yoon, Yune, Yiun, or Youn. According to the 2000 census, 948,600 people had the surname in South Korea. It derives from the Chinese character 尹 also used for the Chinese surname Yǐn and Doãn in Vietnam.

Clans and history

Papyeong clan 

The Papyeong (파평, 坡平) Yun clan, which has its seat in Papyeong-myeon, Paju City, is the most well-known and largest Yun clan. The 2000 South Korean census found 221,433 households claiming membership in the Papyeong clan, with a total population of 713,947.

The clan's founding ancestor is General Yun Sin-dal, who assisted Wang Geon (later King Taejo) in founding the Goryeo Dynasty.

Yoon Gwan was a renowned general in the Goryeo Dynasty. He helped form the Byeolmuban forces to fight and defeat the Jurchen tribes in 1107.

In 2002, a mummified woman with an unborn fetus was discovered in the tomb of Yun Jeong-jeong, a member of the Papyeong Yun clan. It is believed she was the granddaughter of Yun Won-hyung, the brother of Queen Munjeong.

Several Papyeong Yun women became queens during the early Joseon Dynasty, they include Queen Jeonghyeon, Queen Jeonghui, Queen Munjeong and Queen Janggyeong.

Haepyeong clan 

Last ruling Empress, Empress Sunjeong of the Korean Empire, was from another Yoon (Yun) clan, Haepyeong Yun. The first Haepyeong Yoon was a person named Yoon GoonJeong (1046~1083) from the Goryeo Danasty.  According to the 2000 census, 26,000 people belong to this clan.

Yun Bo-seon the second president of South Korea is a distant relative of Empress Sunjeong of the Korean Empire.

Family feud 
When the tomb of Yoon Gwan was rediscovered in the 18th century, it sparked a 300-year-old family feud between the Yun and Sim Clan. The reason for the feud was because a member of the Sim clan was buried uphill from Yoon Gwan's tomb, destroying part of the original tomb in the process. The feud was finally settled in 2008.

People 
Yoon Bit-Garam, South Korean football player
Yoon Bo-mi, South Korean singer and member of girl group Apink
Yun Bong-gil, South Korean independence activist
Yoon Bora, South Korean singer and member of girl group Sistar
Yun Posun, 2nd president of South Korea
Yoon Byung-ho, South Korean actor 
Yoon Chae-kyung, South Korean singer and member of girl group April
Yoon Da-gyeong, South Korean actress
Yoon Do-hyun, South Korean rock singer/songwriter
Yun Dong-ju, Korean poet active during the period of Japanese rule
Yoon Doo-joon, South Korean singer, member and leader of boy band Highlight
Yoon Eun-hye, South Korean actress and singer, member of inactive girl group Baby V.O.X
Yun Gwan, military general during the Goryeo dynasty
Yun Hui-sun, militia leader and Korean independence activist
Isang Yun, Korean composer
James Yun, American entrepreneur, actor and professional wrestler
Jean Yoon, Canadian actress and writer
Yoon Je-kyoon, South Korean film director
Yoon Jeonghan, South Korean singer and member of boy band Seventeen
Yoon Ji-sung, South Korean singer and member of boy band Wanna One
Yoon Jin-young, South Korean rapper
Johnny Yune, Korean-American actor, singer, and comedian
Yoon Jong-hwan, South Korean football player
Yoon Jong-shin, South Korean singer and songwriter
Karl Yune, American actor
Yoon Kye-sang, South Korean actor and singer, member of boy band g.o.d
Yoon Kyun-sang, South Korean actor
Yoon Kyung-shin, South Korean Olympic athlete and handball player
Yun Mi-jin, South Korean archer and Olympic gold medalist
Yoon Mi-rae (born Natasha Shanta Reid), American-born South Korean singer and rapper
Yoon Mi-rim (1933–2020), South Korean voice actress and writer
Rick Yune, American actor, screenwriter, producer, martial artist and model
Sang Yoon, Korean-American restaurateur and chef
Yoon Sang-hyun, South Korean actor and singer
Yoon San-ha, South Korean singer and member of boy group Astro
Yoon Se-ah, South Korean actress
Yun Seondo, Korean philosopher, poet, and politician
Yoon Shi-yoon, South Korean actor and television personality
Yoon So-hee, South Korean actress
Yoon So-ho (born Lee Jung-hoon), South Korean theatre and musical actor 
Yoon Son-ha, South Korean actress, singer and television personality
Yoon Suk-min, South Korean baseball pitcher
Yoon Sun-woo, South Korean actor
Yoon Suk-yeol, 13th president of South Korea
Yun Suk-young, South Korean footballer
Yun Seok-chan, South Korean technologist
Tommy Yune, South Korean-born American comic book author
Yun Yea-ji, South Korean figure skater
Youn Yuh-jung, South Korean actress

Fictional characters 
Yoon Bum, from the 2016−2019 comics series Killing Stalking
Yoon Se-ri, from the 2019-2020 television series Crash Landing on You

Yoon Marie, from 2020 Naver webtoon comic series "나쁜 쪽으로"

See also 
 List of Korean family names
 Korean name
 Korean culture
 Korea

References

Korean-language surnames